Bromley and Beckenham was an ancient hundred in the north west of the county of Kent, England.

It comprised the ancient parishes of Bromley and Beckenham.

Its former area has been entirely absorbed by the growth of London and it broadly corresponds to the current area of the northern part of the London Borough of Bromley.

References

History of the London Borough of Bromley
History of local government in London (pre-1855)
Hundreds of Kent